El Presidente (stylized as EL PRE$IDENTE) is a Chilean drama streaming television series created by Armando Bó. It is based on the 2015 FIFA corruption case and is focused in the former president of ANFP Sergio Jadue, played by Colombian actor Andrés Parra. The first 8-episode season was released on June 5, 2020, on the streaming service Amazon Prime Video. An English dub of the series was released on November 6, 2020.

The second 8-episode season, marketed with the subtitle Jogo da Corrupção (The Corruption Game in English), was released on November 4, 2022.

Plot
Season 1's story revolves around Sergio Jadue and his rise from president of Unión La Calera to president of the Asociación Nacional de Fútbol Profesional (ANFP). He becomes close to Julio Grondona, president of the Argentine Football Association at the time, and starts gaining power among the executives of CONMEBOL before being approached by an FBI Agent to assist in her investigation of money laundering and corruption towards these CONMEBOL executives.

Season 2's story revolves around João Havelange and how he turned FIFA from a simple sports organization into an international powerhouse. He usurps power from the Europeans and holds on to it for almost three decades.

Production
Filming occurred in Talagante, Peñaflor, La Calera, La Pintana, Santiago de Chile, Luque, Buenos Aires and New York, among other locations.

Cast

Season 1

Season 2

Recurring cast

Season 1 
 Agustín Moya as Juan Ángel Napout, el President of CONMEBOL and vice president 1º of FIFA. 
 Víctor Rojas as Luis Chiriboga, President of Federación Ecuatoriana de Fútbol. 
 Jaime Omeñaca as Carlos Chávez Landívar, President of Federación Boliviana de Fútbol. 
 Felipe Armas as Jaime Estévez, President of Club Deportivo Universidad Católica. 
 Paulo Brunetti as Alejandro Burzaco, President of TyC (Torneos y Competencias).
 José Grünewald as El kiosquero in La Calera. 
 Katyna Huberman as Olivia, lawyer and friend of "Nené" 
 Blanca Lewin as Sofía Díaz, journalist of "El Andino" 
 Adriano Castillo as waitress chief in Luque, Paraguay
 Millaray Lobos as Cecilia Domínguez, secretary of Sergio Jadue 
 Antonia Giesen as Fanny, friend of Rosario 
 Horacio Games as João Havelange, ex president of FIFA between 1974 and 1998 
 Ignacia Uribe as Sara, cell phone thief 
 Abián Vainstein as Joseph Blatter
 Heinz Krattiger as FIFA employee, righthand of Joseph Blatter
 Alejandro Bracho as Chuck Blazer, FIFA executive committee member 
 Cristián García-Huidobro as José Yuraszeck, manager of Azul Azul, in charge of Universidad de Chile.
 Marcela Osorio as Neusa Marin, Luis Chiriboga's wife
 Tatiana Molina as Tania Hurtado
 Maricarmen Arrigorriaga as Martha Herrera
 Nicolás Poblete as journalist
 Heidrun Breier as Ruth, Swiss police
 Bastián Bodenhöfer as French detective
 Steevens Benjamin as security doorman 
 Javier Bacchetta as Ciro Cesar Silva

Season 2 
 Lourinelson Vladmir as João Saldanha, Brazilian journalist and football manager
 Fabio Alberti as Augusto Raúl Juárez, Argentinian admiral
 Veruska Souza as Irene
 Marianna Armellini as Larissa, Isabel's lawyer friend and feminist
 Soren Hellerup as Adi Dassler, founder of Adidas
 Federico Salles as Horst Dassler, Adi Dassler's son 
 Caroline Abras as Lena Dassler, Adi Dassler's daughter 
 Isadora Ferrite as Dorinha, João and Isabel's maid 
 Carlos Takeshi as Oé Kitana, President of Japan Football Association
 Hoji Fortuna as Jacques Ashanti
 Favio Posca as Jorge Rafael Videla
 Manuel Ossenkopf as Joseph Blatter
 Agustina Giovio as Barbara Käser, Helmut's daughter
 Joaquín Berthold as Armin Dassler, Horst and Lena's cousin and rival
 Ignacio Cawen as Johan Cruyff

Episodes

Series overview

Season 1 (2020)

Season 2 (2022)

References

External links

Spanish-language television shows
Spanish-language Amazon Prime Video original programming
Portuguese-language television shows
Amazon Prime Video original programming
2020 Chilean television series debuts
Television series set in the 2010s
Chilean drama television series